Trifurcula josefklimeschi is a moth of the family Nepticulidae. It is found south of the line running from France to the Czech Republic and Ukraine.

The wingspan is 4.9-6.5 mm for males and 4.9-6.1 mm for females. Adults emerge from late May to mid-September. There might be two generations per year.

The larvae feed on Dorycnium hirsutum and Dorycnium pentaphyllum. They mine the leaves of their host plant. The mine consists of a narrow corridor, running towards the petiole. From there, the larva descends as a stem miner. The whole course of the mine often stains reddish or brown and the frass is hardly visible externally, while the larvae are visible as a yellow swelling in the stem. The mine is frequently in the more terminal shoots, and can relatively easily be found because of the staining. Larvae have been found in January, February, and early April.

External links
bladmineerders.nl
Fauna Europaea
Nepticulidae and Opostegidae of the world

Nepticulidae
Moths described in 1990
Moths of Europe